The North West Motorway Police Group (NWMPG)  provides a regionalised policing service for the motorways within the Cheshire, Merseyside and Greater Manchester Police areas. It was established in June 2008 in partnership with the Highways Agency.

Operating from bases across the three police areas, NWMPG is made up of over 130 police officers and more than 30 support staff from the three forces. The group is responsible for patrolling a motorway network stretching from the borders with Lancashire in the north to West Mercia and Staffordshire to the south, as well as North Wales to the west and West Yorkshire to the east.

It has been modelled on the Central Motorway Police Group, which has operated in the Midlands since 1990.

Lancashire Police were involved in the NWMPG but withdrew following an announcement in April 2018.

The 24-hour Regional Command and Control Centre, located at National Highways Regional Operational Control Centre at Newton-le-Willows, will maintain contact with all police and National Highways staff deployed by their respective organisations.

See also
 Roads Policing Unit

References

External links

Motorway police units of the United Kingdom
2008 establishments in England
Organizations established in 2008